Bell Springs was a town and stage coach stop on Bell Springs Road in Mendocino County, California.
A post office operated at Bell Springs from 1920 to 1961. The place was named in 1861 by Jim Graham for the cowbells he found at the site. What was once Bell Springs is now the location of the Bell Springs Ranch. Bell Springs Road, 28 miles of steep narrow unpaved mountain road, was originally called Mail Ridge, and was the only through road connecting Mendocino County and Humboldt County before Highway 101 was built.

See also
 Northwestern Pacific Railroad

References

Unincorporated communities in California
Unincorporated communities in Mendocino County, California
1861 establishments in California